Abd ul-Hamid Musa Madibbo was a Sudanese politician. He served as an accountant for the Rizeigat. In the 1953 legislative election he was elected to the House of Representatives from Nyala Baggara East as a Socialist Republican Party candidate. He was the brother of the nazir of the Rizeigat.

References

Members of the Sudanese House of Representatives, elected in 1953